Heer Sial may refer to:
 Heer Sial, the titular character of the Punjabi folktale Heer Ranjha, best known from the poetic rendition by Sufi poet Waris Shah
 Heer Sial (1938 film), a 1938 Indian Punjabi-language film
 Heer Sial (1965 film), a Pakistan Punjabi-language film

See also
 Heer Ranjha (disambiguation)
 Heer (disambiguation)
 Sial (disambiguation)